Neljä Ruusua (Four Roses) is a Finnish rock group formed in the city of Joensuu in 1982. The group consists of guitarist-singer Ilkka Alanko, guitarist Petteri Koistinen, bass guitarist Jari Laakkonen and drummer Kari Kämäräinen. Their style of music was influenced by punk in their earlier years, but changed over time to more conventional Finnish rock and pop music. The most popular albums of the band are Haloo (1992, Hello) and Pop-uskonto (1993, Pop Religion), which bought the band to a great popularity.

The band has released 12 studio albums, with two English albums, Mood (1996) and Not for Sale (1998), which were the band's attempt to break the English language market. After these two unsuccessful albums, the band returned to their native language and released their so-called comeback album Uusi aalto (1999, New Wave). On August 13, 2007, it was announced on the band's official website that the group retreats to spend a quiet life for an indefinite period, and they made their so far last public appearance on August 17. The band's future is completely open, any plans for recordings, concerts or other activities has not been established. In 2011 they played in the Ilosaarirock festival in Joensuu. On January 4, 2012, it was announced on the band's Facebook fan page that the group started recording their 13th album.

History 
The group formed in 1982 under the name Talouskukkaro, and changed their name in 1985; in the late 1990s, they made an attempt to break the English language market, and released some albums under the name 4R. The band's guitarist/vocalist Ilkka Alanko is brother of famous Finnish singer-songwriter Ismo Alanko.

Discography

Studio albums

Compilation albums

EPs

Singles

References 

Finnish musical groups